Carlo Grande may refer to:

 Carlo Grande (rower)
 Carlo Grande (writer)